Sebastian Santin (born 15 June 1994) is an Austrian professional footballer who plays as a midfielder for Austrian Second League club FC Dornbirn.

Club career
He made his Austrian Football First League debut for WSG Wattens on 21 July 2017 in a game against TSV Hartberg.

References

External links
 

1994 births
Living people
Austrian footballers
Association football midfielders
WSG Tirol players
FC Vaduz players
FC Dornbirn 1913 players
2. Liga (Austria) players
Austrian Football Bundesliga players
Austrian Regionalliga players
Swiss Super League players
Austrian expatriate footballers
Austrian expatriate sportspeople in Liechtenstein
Expatriate footballers in Liechtenstein
People from Bregenz
Footballers from Vorarlberg